The Marshall Stability Method is used in pavement design to determine the Optimum Binder Content (OBC) in asphalt concrete.

References 

Pavement engineering